Kathleen Reiter (born 7 September 1988) is a Canadian-Israeli singer most notable for winning the first season of The Voice Israel.

Reiter was born in Montreal, Quebec, Canada, to Israeli parents, and immigrated to Israel just days before the competition. Her father is of Ashkenazi Jewish descent, where her mother is of Moroccan-Jewish (Sephardi Jewish) descent.
Reiter lives in Tel Aviv.

Reiter puts her success in the competition down to being able to sing in English, Hebrew and French.

Reiter's songs include "Shouting to You" and "Nothing Will Help Me" (כלום לא יעזור לי).

References 

http://www.cjnews.com/news/israel/former-montrealer-israeli-song-competition

External links
Official YouTube Channel
Official Facebook Page

1988 births
Canadian emigrants to Israel
Canadian people of Moroccan-Jewish descent
Israeli people of Moroccan-Jewish descent
Jewish Canadian musicians
Israeli Jews
Ashkenazi Jews
Sephardi Jews
Mizrahi Jews
Living people
Singers from Montreal
The Voice (franchise) winners
21st-century Israeli women singers